The Sainbari Murder occurred in 1970 in the house of Sain family in Bardhaman in West Bengal in India, where several people were killed.

Incident
The newspaper incident report puts the date of the incident occurred on 17 March 1970. The Sain brothers were members of a family with strong allegiance towards the Indian National Congress. Naba Kumar Sain — the eldest son of the family —was allegedly blinded and his eyes gouged out while his younger brothers, Malay and Pranab were allegedly hacked to death in front of the watching family members, by the perpetrators. Naba Kumar was killed a year later. The entire incident was done by CPI(M) members, because of the family's support towards Indian National Congress and the victims' refusal to switch allegiance to the CPI(M).
 
A private tutor, Jitendranath Rai, who had come to teach the kids in the family was hacked to death as well. Later, the mother of the Sain brothers was forced to eat rice smeared with the blood of her sons.
 
One of the daughter-in-laws of the family, Rekha Rani, now around 75 years old, recounted the horrors of the incident in an interview with Indian Express. She said, 
 
 - she added.

Swarnalata Josh, the daughter of the Sain family, also witnessed the atrocities of that day. The attack took place on the day of Swarnalata's one-month-old son Amrit Kumar Josh's Shashthi ritual. The frantic attackers of the CPI(M) also wanted to throw the newborn baby into the fire. Later, with the help of the locals, the newborn was saved.

The newborn of that day, now 51-year-old, Amrit Kumar Josh said in a 2011 interview with India's leading daily The Times of India:

Aftermath
Not many people are aware of the Sainbari incident. Even those who are only remember the horror of a mother who was forced to eat rice smeared with the blood of her dead sons. The atrocity in itself was so huge that it eclipsed other acts of monstrosity that occurred on the 17th of March, 1970. Indira Gandhi, then Prime Minister of India, had visited the house in the heart of Bardhaman town to console the bereaved.
 
The shock made the mother lose her mental balance and state from which she never recovered till her death a decade later. Those communist cadres who perpetrated
this violence went on to become ministers and MPs under
the Left-Front government and were never brought to book. CPI(M) leaders Benoy Konar, Anil Basu, Nirupam Sen (former State Minister of Commerce and Industries) and Amal Halder were directly involved in the Sainbari murder case.
 
When the Trinamool government formed a commission in 2011 to probe the incident, Buddhadeb Bhattacharya said "It's politics of vendetta."

References

Communist terrorism
Communist repression
Far-left terrorism
Communist Party of India (Marxist)
Political repression
Crimes against humanity
Crime in West Bengal
1970s in West Bengal
1970 murders in India
Purba Bardhaman district